Silver tungstate is an inorganic tungstate with the chemical formula Ag2WO4. It has been applied in various fields such as photoluminescence, antibacterial action, ozone gas sensors and humidity sensors. It is also used in the electronic and chemical industries, and also used in proteomics research.

Phases 
Silver tungstate occurs in three polymorphic phases: orthorhombic (α), hexagonal (β) and cubic (γ). α-silver tungstate is thermodynamically stable, while β- and γ-silver tungstate are metastable.

Synthesis 
Silver tungstate is synthesised through the following reaction between silver nitrate and sodium tungstate, producing sodium nitrate as a byproduct:

 2AgNO3 + Na2WO4 -> Ag2WO4 + 2NaNO3

References 

Silver compounds
Tungstates